The 2022 NCAA Division I men's soccer championship game (also known as the 2022 NCAA Division I Men's College Cup) was played on December 12, 2022, at WakeMed Soccer Park in Cary, North Carolina and determined the winner of the 2022 NCAA Division I men's soccer tournament, the national collegiate soccer championship in the United States. This was the 64rd edition of the oldest active competition in United States college soccer.

The match featured Syracuse University, which made its first ever appearance in the College Cup final, and Indiana University Bloomington (known athletically as simply "Indiana"), which made its 16th appearance in the final, and its first since 2020.

The match was tied 2–2 at the end of regulation and after extra time.  A penalty shootout was held to determine the College Cup winner, which Syracuse won 7–6. The title gave Syracuse their first NCAA title in men's soccer.

Road to the final 

The NCAA Division I men's soccer tournament, sometimes known as the College Cup, is an American intercollegiate soccer tournament conducted by the National Collegiate Athletic Association (NCAA), and determines the Division I men's national champion. The tournament has been formally held since 1959, when it was an eight-team tournament. Since then, the tournament has expanded to 48 teams, in which every Division I conference tournament champion is allocated a berth. It was Syracuse's first title game appearance in school history, and Indiana's 17th.

Match details

Statistics

References 

Championship Game
NCAA Division I Men's Soccer Championship Games
2022 in sports in North Carolina
December 2022 sports events in the United States
Indiana Hoosiers men's soccer
Syracuse Orange men's soccer